Krylovka may refer to:

Places in Russia
Krylovka, Russia, name of several rural localities in Russia

Places in Ukraine
Krylovka, Pervomayske Raion, Crimea
Krylovka, Saky Raion, Crimea
Krylovka, Andrushivka Raion, Zhytomyr Oblast
Krylovka, Ruzhyn Raion, Zhytomyr Oblast

See also
Raditsa-Krylovka